The 2012–13 First League of the Federation of Bosnia and Herzegovina is the eighteenth season of the First League of the Federation of Bosnia and Herzegovina, the second tier football league of Bosnia and Herzegovina, since its original establishment and the thirteenth as a unified federation-wide league. The 2012–13 fixtures were announced on 6 July 2012. It began on 11 August 2012 and will end on sometimes at the begin of June 2012; a winter break where no matches are played will be in effect between 18 November 2011 and 9 March 2012. Gradina were the last champions, having won their first championship title in the 2011–12 season and earning a promotion to Premier League of Bosnia and Herzegovina.

Sixteen clubs are participating in this session, eleven returning from the previous session, one relegated from Premier League of Bosnia and Herzegovina and four promoted from four regional Second League of the Federation of Bosnia and Herzegovina.

Changes from last season

Team changes

From First League of the FBiH

Promoted to Premier League
 Gradina

Relegated to one of 4 respective regional Second League of the FBiH
 UNIS (Second League of the FBiH – Center)
 Famos-SAŠK Napredak (Second League of the FBiH – Center)
 Orašje (Second League of the FBiH – North)
 Omladinac (Second League of the FBiH – North)

To First League of FBiH
Relegated from Premier League

 Sloboda
Promoted from four regional Second League of the FBiH
 Radnički (Second League of the FBiH – North)
 Troglav (Second League of the FBiH – South)
 Podgrmeč (Second League of the FBiH – West)
 Bosna (Second League of the FBiH – Center)

Teams
UNIS, Famos-SAŠK Napredak, Orašje and Omladinac were relegated to their respective third-level league at the end of the 2011–12 season. For Famos-SAŠK Napredak and Orašje this is the worst league tier they played in since independence of BiH. The relegated teams were replaced by the champions of the four third–level leagues, Radnički from the Second League of the FBiH – North, Troglav from the Second League of the FBiH – South, Podgrmeč from the Second League of the FBiH – West and Bosna from the Second League of the FBiH – Center.

Stadions and locations

Personnel and kits

Note: Flags indicate national team as has been defined under FIFA eligibility rules. Players may hold more than one non-FIFA nationality.

Managerial changes

League table

Results

Clubs season-progress

Season statistics

Transfers
For the list of transfers involving First League clubs during 2012–13 season, please see: List of Bosnia and Herzegovina football transfers summer 2012 and List of Bosnia and Herzegovina football transfers winter 2012–13.

Top goalscorers
Updated 23 March 2013.

Hat-tricks
Updated 23 March 2013.

See also
2011–12 First League of the Federation of Bosnia and Herzegovina
2012–13 Second League of the Federation of Bosnia and Herzegovina
2012–13 First League of the Republika Srpska
2012–13 Premier League of Bosnia and Herzegovina
2012–13 Bosnia and Herzegovina Football Cup
Football Federation of Bosnia and Herzegovina

References

External links
Official site for the Football Federation of Bosnia and Herzegovina
Official site for the Football Federation of the Federation of Bosnia and Herzegovina
Official site for the Football Federation of the Republika of Srpska
2012–13 First League of the Federation of Bosnia and Herzegovina at Soccerway

 

2
Bos
First League of the Federation of Bosnia and Herzegovina seasons